Kadri Altay (1921 - 13 January 2013) was a Turkish brigadier general and politician.

He served as a member of the Grand National Assembly of Turkey in its 17th legislative term from 1983 to 1987.

Reference 
Eski milletvekili vefat etti, TRT Haber

Turkish politicians
1921 births
People from Kastoria
2013 deaths